"Black Is Black" is a song by the Spanish rock band Los Bravos, released in 1966 as the group's debut single for Decca Records. Produced by Ivor Raymonde, it reached number two in the UK, 
number four in the US, 
and number one in Canada.
With the recording's success, Los Bravos became the first Spanish rock band to have an international hit single. 
A dance remix was released as a single in 1986.

Background
Four members of Los Bravos — bassist Miguel Vicens Danus, guitarist Tony Martinez, organist Manuel Fernandez, and drummer Pablo Sanllehi — had previously worked together in the Spanish band Los Sonors. 
Together with German-born singer Michael Kogel, the group set out to achieve success in the European market making English-language pop music. After signing with the Spanish division of Decca Records, the band went to England to work with Ivor Raymonde, a British producer, arranger, conductor, and composer, who had been involved in making UK hit songs with such artists as Marty Wilde, Billy Fury, and Dave Berry. "Black Is Black" was released in 1966 as the band's first Decca single.

Reception
As lead singer Kogel was not a native English speaker (he had to have the lyrics written out phonetically), his vocals had unusual intonations. By coincidence, they sounded similar to that of Gene Pitney, so much so that many listeners assumed that "Black Is Black" was actually a Pitney single. 
In August 1966, the song debuted at number 100 on the U.S. Billboard Hot 100 singles chart. 
It peaked at number four in October, 
and spent 12 weeks on the chart. It reached number one on the Canadian Singles Chart, and peaked at number two in the UK Singles Chart. The single also sold two million copies in Spain.

Shortly after the September 11, 2001 attacks, American media conglomerate company Clear Channel Communications distributed the 2001 Clear Channel memorandum to program directors at the more than 1000 radio stations the company owned. 
The memo contained a list of 162 songs with "questionable lyrics" that the stations should avoid playing.
"Black Is Black" was among the songs on the list.

Other versions 

A French version of the song, entitled "Noir c'est noir", was recorded by Johnny Hallyday and held the number one spot on France's singles chart for seven weeks in the fall of 1966. 

It was also covered by French vocal trio La Belle Epoque as a disco song, and released as a 1976 single. It peaked at number two in the UK, and reached number one in Australia in October 1978.

In 1975 it was sampled in I'm on Fire by the band 5000 Volts.

In 1976, Cerrone released his version as a single from his 3-track LP, Love in C Minor. The track is often mixed into club sets or sampled.

Track listing
"Black Is Black" (Grainger, Hayes, Wadey) – 2:59
"I Want a Name" (Diaz, Raymonde) – 2:38

Chart performance

Weekly charts
Los Bravos

Year-end charts

La Belle Epoque version

References

1966 songs
1966 debut singles
1977 singles
1987 singles
Los Bravos songs
Joy (Austrian band) songs
Decca Records singles
RPM Top Singles number-one singles
Song recordings produced by Ivor Raymonde